Joan Mary Ingram (1910–1981), was a female English international lawn tennis and table tennis player.

Personal life
Ingram was born on 28 February 1910 in Harrow, London and died during the first quarter of 1981.

Table tennis
She won triple bronze at the 1928 World Table Tennis Championships in the women's doubles with Winifred Land, mixed doubles with Charlie Bull and women's singles. In late 1928, Joan Ingram was world ranked fifth. She also won two English Open titles.

Tennis
She represented Great Britain in the 1937 Wightman Cup and reached the 1937 Wimbledon Championships – Women's Doubles semi finals with Evelyn Dearman.

See also
 List of table tennis players
 List of World Table Tennis Championships medalists

References

English female table tennis players
1910 births
1981 deaths
English female tennis players
British female tennis players
World Table Tennis Championships medalists
Tennis people from Greater London